was the 15th and final shōgun of the Ashikaga shogunate in Japan who reigned from 1568 to 1573. His father, Ashikaga Yoshiharu, was the twelfth shōgun, and his brother, Ashikaga Yoshiteru, was the thirteenth shōgun.

Biography
Yoshiaki was a monk of Kokoku-ji temple but after his older brother Yoshiteru was killed by the Miyoshi clan, he returned to secular life and named Yoshiaki. The absence of an effective central authority in the capital of Japan had lasted until the warlord Oda Nobunaga's armies entered Kyoto in 1568, re-establishing the Muromachi shogunate under the puppet shōgun Ashikaga Yoshiaki to begin the Azuchi–Momoyama period. Ashikaga Yoshihide, the fourteenth shōgun, was deposed without ever entering the capital. His childhood name was Chitosemaru (千歳丸).

Most historians consider 1573 to have been the year in which the Ashikaga shogunate ended.  The power of the Ashikaga was effectively destroyed on August 27, 1573, when Nobunaga drove Yoshiaki out of Kyoto.  Yoshiaki became a Buddhist monk, shaving his head and taking the name Sho-san, which he later changed to Rei-o In.

Some note that Yoshiaki did not formally relinquish his empty title; and for this reason, the empty shell of the shogunate could be said to have continued for several more years. Despite a renewed central authority in Kyoto and Nobunaga's attempt to unify the country, the struggle for power among warring states continued. Yoshiaki acted as rallying point for anti-Oda forces. He even raised troops himself, and sent them to fight against Oda Nobunaga's army during the Ishiyama Hongan-ji War. Even after Oda Nobunaga had died in 1582, the former shogun continued his efforts to regain power. According to historian Mary Elizabeth Berry, Yoshiaki still resisted Nobunaga's de facto successor Toyotomi Hideyoshi by 1590.

Family
 Father: Ashikaga Yoshiharu
 Mother: Keijuin (1514–1565)
 Concubines:
 Osako no Kata
 Kosaki no Tsubone
 Children:
 Ashikaga Yoshihiro (1572–1605)
 Isshi Yoshitaka
 Nagayama Yoshiari (1575–1635)
 Yajima Hideyuki

Events of Yoshiaki's bakufu
 1568 – Oda Nobunaga sets Yoshiaki up as shōgun.
 1569 – Yoshiaki's Nijō residence is built.
 1570 – Ikkō monks defeat Oda Nobunaga.
 1571 – Oda Nobunaga destroys Enryaku-ji.
 1573 – Takeda Shingen dies; Yoshiaki is deposed.
 1574 – Oda Nobunaga demolishes Nagashima.
 1580 – Ikkō monks surrender in August.
1582 – Oda Nobunaga dies at Honnō-ji temple.
1588 – Yoshiaki officially resigns from his post as shōgun.

Eras of Yoshiaki's bakufu
The span of years in which Yoshiaki was shōgun are more specifically identified by more than one era name or nengō. 
 Eiroku (1558–1570)
 Genki (1570–1573)
 Tenshō (1573–1592)

Notes

References 
 Ackroyd, Joyce. (1982) Lessons from History: the Tokushi Yoron. Brisbane: University of Queensland Press.  ;  OCLC 7574544
 Titsingh, Isaac. (1834). Nihon Ōdai Ichiran; ou,  Annales des empereurs du Japon.  Paris: Royal Asiatic Society, Oriental Translation Fund of Great Britain and Ireland. OCLC 585069
 

1537 births
1597 deaths
16th-century shōguns
Ashikaga shōguns
Yoshiaki
Japanese Buddhist clergy
Azuchi–Momoyama period Buddhist clergy